The 2014 GP Ouest-France was the 78th edition of the GP Ouest-France, a single-day cycling race. It was the twenty-fourth race of the 2014 UCI World Tour season.

The race was won in the sprint by Sylvain Chavanel ahead of Andrea Fedi and Arthur Vichot, who completed the podium.

Teams
As the GP Ouest–France was a UCI World Tour event, all 18 UCI ProTeams were invited automatically and obligated to send a squad. Six UCI Professional Continental team also competed in the race, and as such, forming the event's 24-team peloton.

The 24 teams that competed in the race were:

Results

Notes

References

External links

GP Ouest-France
GP Ouest-France
Bretagne Classic
August 2014 sports events in France